In physical chemistry, there are numerous quantities associated with chemical compounds and reactions; notably in terms of amounts of substance, activity or concentration of a substance, and the rate of reaction. This article uses SI units.

Introduction

Theoretical chemistry requires quantities from core physics, such as time, volume, temperature, and pressure. But the highly quantitative nature of physical chemistry, in a more specialized way than core physics, uses molar amounts of substance rather than simply counting numbers; this leads to the specialized definitions in this article. Core physics itself rarely uses the mole, except in areas overlapping thermodynamics and chemistry.

Notes on nomenclature

Entity refers to the type of particle/s in question, such as atoms, molecules, complexes, radicals, ions, electrons etc.

Conventionally for concentrations and activities, square brackets [ ] are used around the chemical molecular formula. For an arbitrary atom, generic letters in upright non-bold typeface such as A, B, R, X or Y etc. are often used.

No standard symbols are used for the following quantities, as specifically applied to a substance:

 the mass of a substance m,
 the number of moles of the substance n,
 partial pressure of a gas in a gaseous mixture p (or P),
 some form of energy of a substance (for chemistry enthalpy H is common),
 entropy of a substance S
 the electronegativity of an atom or chemical bond χ.

Usually the symbol for the quantity with a subscript of some reference to the quantity is used, or the quantity is written with the reference to the chemical in round brackets. For example, the mass of water might be written in subscripts as mH2O, mwater, maq, mw (if clear from context) etc., or simply as m(H2O). Another example could be the electronegativity of the fluorine-fluorine covalent bond, which might be written with subscripts χF-F, χFF or χF-F etc., or brackets χ(F-F), χ(FF) etc.

Neither is standard. For the purpose of this article, the nomenclature is as follows, closely (but not exactly) matching standard use.

For general equations with no specific reference to an entity, quantities are written as their symbols with an index to label the component of the mixture - i.e. qi. The labeling is arbitrary in initial choice, but once chosen fixed for the calculation.

If any reference to an actual entity (say hydrogen ions H+) or any entity at all (say X) is made, the quantity symbol q is followed by curved brackets enclosing the molecular formula of X, i.e. q(X), or for a component i of a mixture q(Xi). No confusion should arise with the notation for a mathematical function.

Quantification

General basic quantities

General derived quantities

Kinetics and equilibria

The defining formulae for the equilibrium constants Kc (all reactions) and Kp (gaseous reactions) apply to the general chemical reaction:

 {\nu_1 X1} + {\nu_2 X2} + \cdots + \nu_\mathit{r} X_\mathit{r} <=> {\eta_1 Y1} + {\eta_2 Y2} + \cdots + \eta_\mathit{p} {Y}_\mathit{p}

and the defining equation for the rate constant k applies to the simpler synthesis reaction (one product only):

 {\nu_1 X1} + {\nu_2 X2} + \cdots + \nu_\mathit{r} X_\mathit{r} -> \eta {Y} 

where:

i = dummy index labelling component i of reactant mixture,
j = dummy index labelling component i of product mixture,
Xi = component i of the reactant mixture,
Yj = reactant component j of the product mixture,
r (as an index) = number of reactant components, 
p (as an index) = number of product components, 
νi = stoichiometry number for component i in product mixture,  
ηj = stoichiometry number for component j in product mixture,  
σi = order of reaction for component i in reactant mixture.

The dummy indices on the substances X and Y label the components (arbitrary but fixed for calculation); they are not the numbers of each component molecules as in usual chemistry notation.

The units for the chemical constants are unusual since they can vary depending on the stoichiometry of the reaction, and the number of reactant and product components. The general units for equilibrium constants can be determined by usual methods of dimensional analysis. For the generality of the kinetics and equilibria units below, let the indices for the units be;

For the constant Kc;

Substitute the concentration units into the equation and simplify:,

The procedure is exactly identical for Kp.

For the constant k

Electrochemistry

Notation for half-reaction standard electrode potentials is as follows. The redox reaction

 A + BX <=> B + AX 

split into:
a reduction reaction:  B+ + e^- <=> B 
and an oxidation reaction:  A+ + e^- <=> A 

For the case of a metal-metal half electrode, letting M represent the metal and z be its valency, the half reaction takes the form of a reduction reaction:

 {M^{+\mathit{z}}} + \mathit{z} e^- <=> M

Quantum chemistry

References

Sources
 Physical chemistry, P.W. Atkins, Oxford University Press, 1978, 
 Chemistry, Matter and the Universe, R.E. Dickerson, I. Geis, W.A. Benjamin Inc. (USA), 1976, 
 Chemical thermodynamics, D.J.G. Ives, University Cchemistry Series, Macdonald Technical and Scientific co. .
 Elements of Statistical Thermodynamics (2nd Edition), L.K. Nash, Principles of Chemistry, Addison-Wesley, 1974, 
 Statistical Physics (2nd Edition), F. Mandl, Manchester Physics, John Wiley & Sons, 2008,

Further reading

 Quanta: A handbook of concepts, P.W. Atkins, Oxford University Press, 1974, 
 Molecular Quantum Mechanics Parts I and II: An Introduction to QUANTUM CHEMISTRY (Volume 1), P.W. Atkins, Oxford University Press, 1977, 
 Thermodynamics, From Concepts to Applications (2nd Edition), A. Shavit, C. Gutfinger, CRC Press (Taylor and Francis Group, USA), 2009, 
 Properties of matter, B.H. Flowers, E. Mendoza, Manchester Physics Series, J. Wiley and Sons, 1970, 

Measurement
Mathematical chemistry
Chemical properties
Physical chemistry
Equations